Ben Badis, Algeria is a town and commune in Constantine Province, Algeria. According to the 1998 census it has a population of 13,869.

References

Communes of Constantine Province